Timbrel is an album by Terl Bryant. Released in 1999.

This is an album from ex Iona drummer Terl Bryant. The rhythms of praise flow through these psalms performed by Terl and a group including the talents of Joanne Hogg, Juliet Bryant, Charlie Groves, Ali Groves, Bruce Pont, Troy Donockley, Mike Haughton, Dave Bainbridge, Phil Parker.

The album includes some of the same musical traditions utilised by the band Iona. The character of the project maintains a style of music for Christian worship that is unique in its rhythmic focus. By incorporating vocal talents that are specific to the nature of each song, there is a personal element that allows each presentation to become unique.

Recordings took place at the following:
ICC Studios, Eastbourne, England – (Engineer Neil Costello)
Soundfield, Derby, England – (Engineer Neil Costello)
Gemini Studios, Ipswich, England – (Engineer Neil Costello)

Personnel

Band
 Terl Bryant – Drums, Percussion, Bodhrans, Rainstick, Antique Snare Drums, Effect Cymbals, Spanner Chimes, Finger Cymbals, Zibel and Floor Toms, Key Chimes, Earth Plates, Burma Bell, Pin Chimes, Gong, Dholak, Tambourine, Bongos, Sally Army Bass Drum
 Dave Bainbridge – Keyboards, Electric and Acoustic Guitars, Bass Synth, E-Bow Guitar
 Juliet Bryant – Backings Vocals
 Nicole Riorden – Backings Vocals
 Charlie Groves – Backing Vocals, Violin
 Ali Groves – Backing Vocals
 Tim Harries – Bass
 Stuart Garrand – Vocals, E-Bow and Tremolo Guitars, Acoustic Guitar
 Joanne Hogg – Vocals, High Backing Vocals
 Pat Grueber – Bass
 Phil Barker – Bass, Fretless Bass
 Troy Donockley – Uilleann pipes, Low Whistle
 Peter Bones – Acoustic & Electric Guitars, E-Bow Guitar, Bass, Percussion
 Mike Parlett – Soprano Saxophone
 Michael Haughton – Baritone Saxophone, Tin Whistle
 Bruce Pont – Maldek
 Mark Edwards – Piano, Keyboards
 Ben Okfar – Vocals (English, Ibo), Talking Drum
 Phil Crabbe – Wood Blocks, Cowbell, Triangle, Cymbal, Bongos, Snare Drums
 Mike Sturgis – Bass Drum, Old Toms, Cabasa, Snare Rim, Snare Drums
Alex Legg – Vocals
Dave Clifton – Guitar, High Vocals
Andy Coughlan – Bass
Ten drummers
Terl Bryant
Chip Bailey
Phil Crabbe
Mark Green
Dave Luzquinos
Phil Manning
Martin Neil
Calum Rees
Mike Sturgis
Dan Weeks

Track listing
Disc – Total Time 65:28
"The Lord Reigns" – 4:48
"Christ Be in Me" – 4:25
"Israel" – 4:39
"A Dangerous Sea" – 4:53
"Barefoot in the Grass" – 2:25
"The King of Love" – 3:17
"Though I Walk" – 5:33
"In the Shadow of Great Wings" – 5:28
"Do Not Fear" – 7:13
"The Battle Prayer" – 6:17
"Vision of Hope" – 4:06
"Here is Love" – 5:09
"Ten Drummers Drumming" – 7:15

Release details
1999, UK, Rhythm House Records/ICC Records RHR 4249, Release Date ? ? 1999, CD

1999 albums
Terl Bryant albums